Air Commodore Andrew James Wray Geddes,  (31 July 1906 – 15 December 1988) was the senior Royal Air Force officer during the Second World War who led the planning for Operation Manna, the air drop of food supplies to the starving population of the Netherlands.

Early life
Geddes was born in Belgaum, India, the son of Major Malcolm Henry Burdett Geddes, an Indian Army officer. He soon returned to England with his mother and much later graduated from the Royal Military Academy in Woolwich and joined the Royal Artillery in 1926.

Military career
Geddes began his military career in the British Army before being seconded to the Royal Air Force (RAF) in 1928. He trained at RAF Sealand before joining No. 4 Squadron RAF at RAF Farnborough flying the Bristol F.2 Fighter and later the Armstrong Whitworth Atlas.

In 1932, Geddes rejoined the Royal Artillery but was again seconded to the RAF in 1935, this time as a Flight Commander with No. 2 Squadron RAF at RAF Manston. By 1938, Geddes was the squadron commander.

Geddes had an active role in the planning of Operation Overlord, the Allied invasion of Normandy in June 1944. Shortly after the landing on 6 June 1944, Geddes flew a Mustang over the invasion beaches taking some of the first pictures of the invasion.

Although Geddes retained his army commission (reaching the rank of major in 1943), he spent all of the Second World War in the RAF. He finally fully transferred to the RAF in 1945.

Geddes was appointed an Officer of the Order of the British Empire in the 1941 New Year Honours, was awarded the Distinguished Service Order in June 1943, Mentioned in Despatches on 1 January and 14 June 1945, granted a Commander of the United States Legion of Merit in October 1945, and advanced to Commander of the Order of the British Empire in the 1946 New Year Honours.

Operation Manna
From 1 April 1943 until VE-Day Air Commodore Geddes was responsible for the Operations and Plans of the Second Tactical Air Force RAF. In the spring of 1945 he was responsible for the organising of Operation Manna; the dropping of food and other essentials to the starving Dutch population still in the occupied areas of the Netherlands.

The first food drops began on 29 April 1945, even though no formal treaty had been signed between the Allies and Germans. That day over 240 Lancaster's flew at low level to drop 535 tons of food at six designated places in the west of the Netherlands agreed with Germans.

In case the Allies were trying to use the drop for military purposes (for example dropping paratroopers or arms for partisans), the Germans sent anti-aircraft guns to four of the locations. Local Dutch organising committees then set up a plan to collect the air drops and distribute the food.

Post military career

Geddes retired from the RAF on 29 September 1954 with the rank of air commodore and worked in local government.

The road "Air Commodore Geddespad" in Rotterdam was named after him.

References

1906 births
1988 deaths
Commanders of the Legion of Merit
Commanders of the Order of the British Empire
Companions of the Distinguished Service Order
Royal Air Force air commodores
Royal Field Artillery officers
20th-century British Army personnel
Royal Air Force pilots of World War II
British people in colonial India